Sivapardus is an extinct, little-known genus of felid. It was described in 1969 and has only one species assigned to it, S. punjabiensis.

References

Prehistoric felines
Fossil taxa described in 1969
Prehistoric carnivoran genera